Mário Santos de Matos (born 21 June 1988) is a Portuguese professional footballer who last played for União Madeira as a goalkeeper. He also holds Belgian citizenship.

External links

1988 births
Living people
Belgian people of Portuguese descent
Footballers from Brussels
Belgian footballers
Portuguese footballers
Association football goalkeepers
Challenger Pro League players
A.F.C. Tubize players
Liga Portugal 2 players
G.D. Estoril Praia players
C.F. União players